Harry Bucknall (born 1965) is a British writer best known for books In the Dolphin's Wake and Like a Tramp Like a Pilgrim. He drew inspiration for these books from several major trips he took throughout his life. Bucknall has written for multiple newspapers and outlets, including The Spectator, The Scotsman, and Country Life.

Bucknall was educated at the Harrow School and the Royal Military Academy Sandhurst and served as an officer in the Coldstream Guards for 12 years. He is the grandson of Lt Gen Gerard Bucknall and younger brother of James Bucknall. After retiring Bucknall set out on a 5,500 mile journey from Venice to Istanbul via 36 islands and every island chain in the Greek Archipelago. It included 57 sea passages on 35 ferries, four landing craft, three hydrofoils, a fishing caique and a sea plane. The story of the trip became his first book, In the Dolphin's Wake.

In 2012 Bucknall embarked on another trip, where he walked 1,411 miles from London to Rome following the Via Francigena, an ancient pilgrim path. The story of this journey, Like a Tramp Like a Pilgrim, was published by Bloomsbury Publishing in July 2014.

In December 2014, Buckall and his former army driver Jock Davis, now a sergeant in the Metropolitan Police, walked 133 miles from Dorset to London in order to raise funds for homeless former servicemen and women. A year later, they followed it up with a 335-mile walk from the Scottish borders to St Paul's Cathedral in London, following the journey made by George Monck, 1st Duke of Albemarle when he marched from Coldstream to London enabling the Restoration of King Charles II. Their 14-day walk raised £28,000 for homeless veterans.

Bucknall was admitted as a Freeman of the City of London in 2015.

His new book A Road for All Seasons, telling the story of his 6,518-mile journey across the length and breadth of Britain, will be published by Little Brown in August 2022.

References

English male writers
British travel writers
Living people
1965 births
21st-century British writers
People educated at Harrow School
Graduates of the Royal Military Academy Sandhurst